Square Root Day is an unofficial holiday celebrated on days when both the day of the month and the month are the square root of the last two digits of the year. For example, the last Square Root Day was April 4, 2016 (4/4/16), and the next Square Root Day will be May 5, 2025 (5/5/25). The final Square Root Day of the century will occur on September 9, 2081. Square Root Days fall upon the same nine dates each century.

Ron Gordon, a Redwood City, California high school teacher, created the first Square Root Day for September 9, 1981 (9/9/81).  Gordon remains the holiday's publicist, sending news releases to world media outlets. Gordon's daughter set up a Facebook group where people can share how they were celebrating the day.

One suggested way of celebrating the holiday is by eating radishes or other root vegetables cut into shapes with square cross sections (thus creating a "square root").

Full list 
Square Root Day occurs on the following dates each century:

1/1/01
2/2/04
3/3/09
4/4/16
5/5/25
6/6/36
7/7/49
8/8/64
9/9/81

Distribution 
 
The number of years between consecutive Square Root Days in a century is consecutive odd numbers: 3, 5, 7, 9, 11, 13, 15, 17. This illustrates the fact that every odd number is the difference of two consecutive squares.

See also
Mole Day
Pi Day
Sequential Day

References

Unofficial observances
Observances about science
Recurring events established in 1981